"Women" is a song released by English rock band Def Leppard in 1987 from the album Hysteria. It was the second overall but first single of the album released in the United States. The song was also released as a single in Canada, Australia, Japan, and was part of a double-A side single with "Animal" in Germany. In most other parts of the world, "Animal" was the first single released from the album.

Background
The single's B-side track, "Tear It Down", was written during a recording session following the completion of the Hysteria album, where the band laid down several tracks intended as B-sides for the Hysteria singles. Subsequently, the song itself received radio airplay and was later performed by the band live at the 1989 MTV Video Music Awards.

The band later re-recorded "Tear It Down" for the Adrenalize album.

"Women" is the only one of the seven Hysteria singles not to appear on the Vault compilation. However, it is included in disc 2 of Rock of Ages: The Definitive Collection.

Music video
The music video for "Women" focuses on a boy who reads a comic book outside an abandoned warehouse while the band performs inside. The comic book, titled "Def Leppard and the Women of Doom!", features a skateboarding protagonist named Def Leppard, who travels to a distant planet and battles evil aliens to liberate female robots. This was also the first video filmed after drummer Rick Allen became an amputee after losing his left arm in an auto collision.

Track listing
US Mercury Records 888 757-7 DJ 7" single

US Mercury Records 888 757-7 7" single

US CD single

Canada 7" single

Personnel

Def Leppard
 Joe Elliott – lead vocals
 Steve Clark – rhythm guitars, backing vocals 
 Phil Collen – lead guitars, backing vocals 
 Rick Savage – bass, backing vocals 
 Rick Allen – drums

Additional personnel
 Philip "Art School" Nicholas – keyboards

Charts

References

Def Leppard songs
1987 singles
Songs written by Robert John "Mutt" Lange
Song recordings produced by Robert John "Mutt" Lange
Songs written by Joe Elliott
Songs written by Phil Collen
Songs written by Steve Clark
Songs written by Rick Savage
1987 songs
Mercury Records singles